Al-Mukharram District is a district of the Homs Governorate in central Syria. Administrative centre is the city of al-Mukharram. At the 2004 census, the district had a population of 52,068.

Sub-districts
The district of al-Mukharram is divided into two sub-districts or nawāḥī (population as of 2004):
al-Mukharram Subdistrict (ناحية المخرم): population 32,447.
Jubb al-Jarrah Subdistrict (ناحية جب الجراح): population 19,621.

References

 
Districts of Homs Governorate